Charleville was a constituency in County Cork represented in the Irish House of Commons until its abolition on 1 January 1801.

History
The town of Charleville was named after Charles II. It was enfranchised in 1673, with a sovereign, 12 burgesses and freemen. It belonged to the Earl of Orrery, a branch of the Boyle family. In the Patriot Parliament of 1689 summoned by James II, Charleville was represented with two members. At the end of the 18th Century the constituency was controlled by the Earl of Shannon and the  Earl of Cork who each nominated one member. The compensation of £15,000 for the loss of the seats in the Act of Union 1800 was divided equally between them.

Members of Parliament, 1673–1801

1689–1801

Notes

References

Bibliography

Johnston-Liik, E. M. (2002). History of the Irish Parliament, 1692–1800., Publisher: Ulster Historical Foundation (28 Feb 2002),
Tim Cadogan and Jeremiah Falvey, A Biographical Dictionary of Cork, 2006, Four Courts Press , 
T. W. Moody, F. X. Martin, F. J. Byrne, A New History of Ireland 1534–1691, Oxford University Press, 1978

Constituencies of the Parliament of Ireland (pre-1801)
Historic constituencies in County Cork
1673 establishments in Ireland
1800 disestablishments in Ireland
Constituencies established in 1673
Constituencies disestablished in 1800